NME (or New Musical Express) is a British weekly pop music newspaper which now exists only online. NME was the first record chart in the United Kingdom based on sales having imitated an idea started in American Billboard magazine on 14 November 1952. From 1960, Record Retailer began compiling a chart and this is regarded by The Official Charts Company and Guinness' British Hit Singles & Albums as the canonical source for the British singles chart. Prior to 15 February 1969, when the British Market Research Bureau (BMRB) chart was established as part of a joint commission by Record Retailer and the BBC, there was no one universally accepted or official source and many periodicals compiled their own chart. Nevertheless, in the 1960s, NME had the biggest circulation of charts in the decade and was most widely followed. Although not regarded as the primary source for UK charts, NME continued to compile an independent chart until 11 June 1988 (Melody Maker ended its own independently compiled chart the preceding week on 4 June). It was the longest independently complied chart and, when it ceased, NME published the Market Research Information Bureau chart. From 19 February 1983 to 22 September 1984, the new NME chart was broadcast weekly on Capital Radio's Pick of the Pops Take Two, presented by Alan Freeman; this show also featured archive NME charts.

Notable differences when compared to the official chart run by BMRB and, later, Gallup are an additional two number-one singles in the decade for Rick Astley, David Bowie, Spandau Ballet and Phil Collins. Significantly, Tears for Fears' song "Everybody Wants to Rule the World" spent three weeks at the top of the NME chart although it never topped the Gallup chart. Additionally, as well as making number one on the NME chart and not the official chart, a-ha's "Take On Me" and Ultravox's "Vienna" were also in the top five best-selling singles of their year. Eighteen acts achieved a number-one single on the NME chart but never had an official number-one single although two of these had songs they had written reach number one when performed by another artist.

Number-one singles

Notes

References
Footnotes

Sources

Lists of number-one songs in the United Kingdom
New Musical Express
1980s in British music